Cowles may refer to:

Surname
Alfred Cowles Sr. (1832–1889), publisher Chicago, spouse Sarah Hutchinson
Alfred Cowles Jr. (1865–1929) publisher, businessman and lawyer
Alfred Cowles (III) (1891–1984) businessman and economist
Anna Roosevelt Cowles (Bamie) (1855–1931), sister of Theodore Roosevelt, aunt of Eleanor Roosevelt
Betsy Mix Cowles (1810–1876), feminist and educator, Ohio
Edwin Cowles (1825–1890), publisher Cleveland, spouse Elizabeth Hutchinson
Eunice Caldwell Cowles (1811-1903), American educator
Fleur Cowles (1908–2009), artist
Gardner Cowles Sr. (1861–1946), banker, publisher and politician
Gardner Cowles Jr. (Mike) (1903–1985), publisher
George A. Cowles, an American ranching pioneer
Henry Chandler Cowles (1869–1939), botanist and ecological pioneer
Ione Virginia Hill Cowles (1858-1940), American clubwoman, social leader
John Cowles Sr. (1898–1983), publisher
John Cowles Jr. (1929–2012), publisher and philanthropist
Louisa F. Cowles (1842–1924), educator
Osborne Cowles, college basketball coach at the University of Minnesota and University of Michigan
Paul Cowles, a member of the Committee of Fifty (1906)
Raymond B. Cowles (1896-1975), American herpetologist
Robert Cowles, politician and member of the Wisconsin State Senate
Shirley Cowles (1940-), New Zealand cricketer 
Virginia Cowles (1910-1983), American journalist
William H. H. Cowles (1840–1901), U.S. politician
William S. Cowles (1846–1923), admiral

Place names
Cowles, Nebraska, a village located in Webster County, Nebraska
Cowles Mountain, a hill within the city limits of San Diego, California

Other
 Cowles Center for Dance and the Performing Arts
Cowles Conservatory in the Minneapolis Sculpture Garden
Cowles Foundation (Cowles Commission for Research in Economics)
Cowles House (disambiguation), various places
Cowles Electric Smelting and Aluminum Company, Lockport, New York USA and Cowles Syndicate Company, Staffordshire, England
Cowles Syndicate, see King Features Syndicate
Cowles Media Company, Minneapolis, Minnesota, and Des Moines, Iowa, USA
Cowles Company, Spokane, Washington, USA